Following is a list of all Article III United States federal judges appointed by President Harry S. Truman during his presidency. In total Truman appointed 133 Article III federal judges, including 4 Justices to the Supreme Court of the United States (including one Chief Justice), 27 judges to the United States Courts of Appeals, and 102 judges to the United States district courts.

Additionally, 9 Article I federal judge appointments are listed, including 3 judges to the United States Court of Customs and Patent Appeals, 2 judges to the United States Court of Claims and 4 judges to the United States Customs Court.

United States Supreme Court justices

Courts of appeals

District courts

Specialty courts (Article I)

United States Court of Customs and Patent Appeals

United States Court of Claims

United States Customs Court

Notes

Renominations

References
General

 

Specific

Sources
 Federal Judicial Center

Truman

Harry S. Truman-related lists